Juosep (Jooseppi) Kauranen (23 May 1880 in Muolaa – 8 November 1935) was a Finnish farmer and politician. He was a member of the Parliament of Finland from 1922 until his death in 1935, representing the Agrarian League.

References

1880 births
1935 deaths
People from Vyborg District
People from Viipuri Province (Grand Duchy of Finland)
Centre Party (Finland) politicians
Members of the Parliament of Finland (1922–24)
Members of the Parliament of Finland (1924–27)
Members of the Parliament of Finland (1927–29)
Members of the Parliament of Finland (1929–30)
Members of the Parliament of Finland (1930–33)
Members of the Parliament of Finland (1933–36)
Finnish farmers